The Sepsidae are a family of flies, commonly called the black scavenger flies or ensign flies. Over 300 species are described worldwide. They are usually found around dung or decaying plant and animal material. Many species resemble ants, having a "waist" and glossy black body. Many Sepsidae have a curious wing-waving habit made more apparent by dark patches at the wing end.

Many  species have a very wide distribution, reflecting  the coprophagous habit of most Sepsidae.  Some species have been spread over large territories in association with livestock. Adult flies are found mostly on mammal excrement, including that of humans (less often on other rotting organic matter), where eggs are laid and larvae develop, and on nearby vegetation, carrion, fermenting tree sap, and shrubs and herbs.

Many Sepsidae apparently play an important biological role as decomposers of mammal and other animal excrement. Some species may have a limited hygienic importance because of their association with human feces. Others are useful tools in forensic entomology.

Description

For terms, see Morphology of Diptera.
Sepsids are slender flies that resemble minute, winged ants. They are usually black in color, sometimes lustrous, and sometimes with silvery hairs on the thorax. The head is rounded. Sepsids have one or more bristles at the posteroventral margin of the posterior spiracle of the thorax, a character that distinguishes the family from other acalyptrates. The postvertical bristles are divergent or sometimes absent. Up to three pairs of frontal bristles are seen. They have ocelli with ocellar bristles. Vibrissae and palpi are poorly developed. The front legs of the male often have extrusions, spurs, teeth, or other ornamentation. The tibia has a dorsal preapical bristle in most genera. The abdomen is usually constricted in the basal part.

The larva is slender, tapering at the front end, and smooth except for ventral creeping welts. The larva is amphipneustic: it has two pairs of spiracles, one toward the head and one at the tail. The bulbous posterior end with its pair of spiracles distinguishes it from the larvae of other acalyptrates.

The pupa is enclosed within a puparium.

Classification

Genera include:

Adriapontia Ozerov,  1996
Afromeroplius Ozerov, 1996
Afronemopoda Ozerov, 2004
Afrosepsis Ozerov, 1996
Archisepsis Silva, 1993
Australosepsis Malloch, 1925
Brachythoracosepsis Ozerov, 1996
Decachaetophora Duda, 1926
Diploosmeteriosepsis Ozerov, 1996
Dicranosepsis Duda, 1926
Dudamira Ozerov, 1996
Idiosepsis Ozerov, 1990
Lasionemopoda Duda, 1926
Lasiosepsis Duda, 1926
Lateosepsis Ozerov, 2004
Leptomerosepsis Duda, 1926
Meropliosepsis Duda, 1926
Meroplius Rondani, 1874
Microsepsis Silva, 1993
Mucha Ozerov, 1992
Nemopoda Robineau-Desvoidy, 1830
Ortalischema Frey, 1925
Orygma Meigen, 1830
Palaeosepsioides Ozerov, 1992
Palaeosepsis Duda, 1926
Parapalaeosepsis Duda, 1926
Paratoxopoda Duda, 1926
Perochaeta Duda, 1926
†Protorygma Hennig, 1965
Pseudonemopoda Duda, 1926
Pseudopalaeosepsis Ozerov, 1992
Saltella Robineau-Desvoidy, 1830
Sepsis Fallén, 1810
Susanomira Pont, 1987
Themira Robineau-Desvoidy, 1830
Toxopoda Macquart, 1851
Xenosepsis Malloch, 1925
Zuskamira Pont, 1987

See also
List of sepsid fly species recorded in Europe

References

Further reading

Identification
Duda, O. 1926 Monographie der Sepsiden (Dipt.). Ann. Naturhist. Mus. Wien 39 (1925): 1-153 and 40 (1926) : 1-110.This work is partly out of date but still the only review of world genera.
Willi Hennig, 1949: 39a. Sepsidae. In Erwin Lindner : Die Fliegen der Paläarktischen Region, Bd. V: 1-91, Textfig. 1-81a-d, Taf. I-X, Stuttgart. The only comprehensive work on Palaearctic genera and species.
Adrian C. Pont and Rudolf Meier The Sepsidae (Diptera) of Europe. Fauna Entomologica Scandinavica Volume 37.  198 pages. 
A.L. Ozerov Sepsid Flies (Diptera, Sepsidae) of Russia's Fauna. Studies on the fauna; Archives of the Zoological Museum of Moscow State University: Zool. Mus. Moscow. Univ. Publ.Language: Russian, title, contents and a summary in English. 184 pages.A very well illustrated guide to all 57 species from 11 genera of Sepsidae flies occurring in Russia, with keys to adults and pre-imaginal stages, and accounts concerning anatomy, phylogeny and distribution.
Silva, V. C. . Revision of the family Sepsidae of the Neotropical region. ii. The genus Meropliosepsis Duda, 1926 (Diptera, Schizophora). Revista Brasileira de Entomologia, v. 36, n. 3, p. 549-552, 1992.
K. G. V. Smith, 1989 An introduction to the immature stages of British Flies. Diptera Larvae, with notes on eggs, puparia and pupae.Handbooks for the Identification of British Insects Vol 10 Part 14. pdf  download manual (two parts Main text and figures index)
 Lives in [Rocky Mountains] of Colorado, in the United States.

Species lists
West Palaearctic including Russia
Nearctic
Australasian/Oceanian
Japan

External links

Family Sepsidae at EOL
Black Scavenger Fly - diagnostic photographs
Family description and images
Images of Sepsidae on Diptera.info

 
Brachycera families
Articles containing video clips